Sarpuzal (also Romanized as Sarpūzal) is a village in Sar Firuzabad Rural District, Firuzabad District, Kermanshah County, Kermanshah Province, Iran. As of the 2006 census, its population was 57, in 13 families.

References 

Populated places in Kermanshah County